"Everytime" is a 1998 song by Tatyana Ali written by Alex Cantrall with lyrics by Joe Priolo, produced by Will Smith. It was released as the third single from the debut album Kiss the Sky. The song reached 20 on the UK singles chart in June through August 1999, and had a second outing up to 16 on the US R&B chart in August 2000.

Charts

References

1998 songs
1999 singles
Tatyana Ali songs